National Programme for Improvement of Watercourses (NPIW) is project of construction of watercourses in  Pakistan to solve the problem of scarcity of irrigation water. This project is based on different  conservation strategies. The programme was launched simultaneously in all the provinces of the Pakistan in 2004. The programme aims at lining of 33000 watercourses in Sindh province. It is the biggest engineering project in which more than 2300 engineers are employed.

References

Irrigation in Pakistan